TGL is a planned golf league created by TMRW Sports, a venture formed by sports executive Mike McCarley and professional golfers Tiger Woods and Rory McIlroy, in partnership with the PGA Tour. It will launch in January 2024, with events held on Monday nights in conjunction with the PGA Tour schedule.

History
TGL, a new tech-infused team golf league in partnership with the PGA Tour, will showcase team competitions fusing advanced tech and live action from a custom-built venue. Woods, McIlroy, Justin Thomas and Jon Rahm were the first four golfers to commit to competing. The next pair to join the group, former Masters Tournament  champion Adam Scott, who told Sports Illustrated his decision to join TGL was highly motivated by his desire to enhance the future of the game, on both a recreational and professional level  and former PGA Championship winner Collin Morikawa. U.S. Open Champion Matt Fitzpatrick was number seven,  followed by six time PGA tour winner Max Homa and seven time PGA tour winner Billy Horschel who round out the first half of the league's 18 players.  The second half of the group started with two Olympic gold medalists. Justin Rose won gold in the 2016 Olympic Games in Rio and Xander Schauffele in Tokyo in 2020.  

On August 24, 2022, the PGA Tour, along with McIlroy, Woods, and McCarley, announced the formation of TGL.  It will initially feature six teams of three PGA Tour players each, competing head-to-head in 18-hole match play. The venue offers a first-of-its-kind experience for golf, enabled by a data-rich virtual course combined with a tech-infused short-game complex.

Fifteen matches make up the regular season, each lasting two hours and  played in primetime on Monday nights. The semifinals and a final match end the season.

TMRW Sports is building the first TGL venue in Palm Beach, Florida, through a partnership with Palm Beach State College.The group broke ground at the venue on February 20, 2023 on the interactive, indoor tech golf league. It includes educational and recreational initiatives that will benefit Palm Beach State College students, by offering paid internships and other technology, hospitality and administrative services opportunities.

CAA Icon is designing, developing and overseeing the construction of the venue. The technological aspects of the building will be the first of its kind, in part because the golf action will flow between virtual and reality on every hole.

Broadcasting
No broadcaster for TGL was announced during the league's unveiling. However, an August 23, 2022 report in Sports Business Journal says NBC Sports has an option to carry league events.

References 

PGA Tour